Chaku River is a tributory river of Bhotekoshi River. The river is located in Sindhupalchowk District of central Nepal.

Infrastructures
The river has a large hydropower potential and a number of projects are under development such as
 Chaku Khola Hydropower Station
 Middle Chaku Khola Hydropower Station
 Lower Chaku Khola Hydropower Station

See also
List of rivers of Nepal

References

Rivers of Bagmati Province